is a passenger railway station located in the city of Mimasaka, Okayama Prefecture, Japan, operated by West Japan Railway Company (JR West).

Lines

Station layout
The station consists of one ground-level side platform serving a single bi-directional track. The station is unattended.

History
Mimasaka-Doi Station opened on April 8, 1936.  With the privatization of the Japan National Railways (JNR) on April 1, 1987, the station came under the aegis of the West Japan Railway Company. A new station building was completed in February 2021.

Passenger statistics
In fiscal 2019, the station was used by an average of 21 passengers daily.

Surrounding area
Japan National Route 179

See also
List of railway stations in Japan

References

External links

 Mimasaka-Doi Station Official Site

Railway stations in Okayama Prefecture
Kishin Line
Railway stations in Japan opened in 1936
Mimasaka, Okayama